UNI Global Union, formerly Union Network International (UNI), is a global union federation for the skills and services sectors, gathering national and regional trade union. It has affiliated unions in 150 countries representing 20 million workers. The head office is in Nyon, Switzerland. UNI Global Union ratified over 50 Global Framework Agreements with multinational corporation as of 2021.

History
UNI was the result of the merger of four organisations: International Federation of Commercial, Clerical, Professional and Technical Employees (FIET), Media and Entertainment International (MEI), International Graphical Federation (IGF) and Communications International (CI). They merged on 1 January 2000, to form Union Network International. On 2 March 2009, the federation changed its name to UNI Global Union.

Leadership

General Secretaries
2000: Philip Jennings
2018: Christy Hoffman

Presidents
2000: Kurt van Haaren
2001: Maj-Len Remahl
2003: Joseph T. Hansen
2010: Joe de Bruyn
2014: Ann Selin
2018: Ruben Cortina

References

External links

 
Trade unions established in 2000